Barry Manilow (born 1943) is an American singer-songwriter.

Barry Manilow may also refer to:

 Barry Manilow (1973 album), an album by Barry Manilow, later issued as Barry Manilow I
 Barry Manilow II, a 1974 album by Manilow
 Barry Manilow (1989 album), an album by Manilow